World oil crisis may refer to:

2000s energy crisis
1973 oil crisis
World War II